Hyperplatys is a genus of longhorn beetles of the subfamily Lamiinae. It was described by Haldeman in 1847.

Species
 Hyperplatys argentinus (Berg, 1889)
 Hyperplatys argus (Bates, 1872)
 Hyperplatys aspersa (Say, 1824)
 Hyperplatys californica Casey, 1892
 Hyperplatys cana (Bates, 1863)
 Hyperplatys femoralis Haldeman, 1847
 Hyperplatys griseomaculata Fisher, 1926
 Hyperplatys maculata Haldeman, 1847
 Hyperplatys montana Casey, 1913
 Hyperplatys pardalis (Bates, 1881)
 Hyperplatys pusillus (Bates, 1863

References

Acanthocinini
Taxa named by Samuel Stehman Haldeman